KBUF (1030 AM) is a radio station broadcasting a News Talk Information format. Licensed to Holcomb, Kansas, United States, the station is currently owned by Mark Yearout, through licensee Southwind Broadcasting, LLC, and features programming from ABC Radio and Premiere Radio Networks. Formerly a country-oriented station, the station runs news and talk, and features strong agribusiness reporting.

Former hosts/announcers
Hap Larson
Corey Hayze (Program Director 1993–1995)
Loretta P. "Lory Williams" Johnson

References

External links

BUF
News and talk radio stations in the United States
Radio stations established in 1976
1976 establishments in Kansas